Parsed Character Data (PCDATA) is a data definition that originated in Standard Generalized Markup Language (SGML), and is used also in Extensible Markup Language (XML) Document Type Definition (DTD) to designate mixed content XML elements.

Example
The following sender-element could be part of an XML-document:
<sender>Anton Smith</sender>
The string "Anton Smith" would be considered as parsed character data.

When declaring document elements.  An element declaration employing the #PCDATA content model value does not allow for child elements.

See also
 CDATA

References

XML